Europe of 100 Flags is a concept developed by Breton nationalist Yann Fouéré in his 1968 book, L'Europe aux Cent Drapeaux. It proposes a redrawing of European borders in a way that more resembles a map of the region during the Middle Ages, including the creation of states for Basques, Bretons, and Flemings. These regions would be designed to promote regionalism and European federalism as a replacement for nationalism, and redefine extreme European boundaries more strictly in terms of ethnically homogeneous "authentic" historic regions. These individually ethnically "pure" states would then be incorporated under a "post-liberal-pan-European framework".

It has been embraced by many in the far-right, such as those among the Identitarian movement and the Nouvelle Droite – the French New Right – and has been described as a "multiculturalism of the right", one based on exclusion, homogeneity, and ethnoregionalism. The Oxford Handbook of the Radical Right describes it as a minor exception to the radical right's preference for ethnic nationalism. Political scientist Alberto Spektorowski described it as a way for the radical-right to publicly recognize outsiders while preventing them from assimilating or gaining political power. It has also been described as a form of "ultra-regionalism" as a re-framing of the ultra-nationalism common to fascism.

The radical federalist concept of breaking Europe up into small self-administering regions was raised by Count Helmuth James Moltke, one of the members of the Kreisau Circle – a clandestine group which opposed Adolf Hitler and the Nazi regime – as a possible post-Nazi political system for the continent.

See also

 Ethnopluralism
 Neo-nationalism
 Right-wing populism
 Ultranationalism

References

Nationalism in Europe
Pan-European nationalism
Regionalism (politics)
Stateless nationalism in Europe
Identitarian movement